The Peery Foundation is a private foundation based in Palo Alto, California, US. According to its website, it "primarily invests in early to mid-stage social entrepreneurs who are effectively addressing the issues of poverty." It funds local organizations in the Bay Area as well as organizations working to combat poverty and its ill-effects worldwide.

Operations

Criteria for funding organizations

The Peery Foundation has four portfolios of grantees: Local, Regional, Global, and Ecosystems. According to their website, they use different criteria for grantees in each portfolio. There are three broad aspects to the criteria used in all portfolios: people (the people running the organization being funded), idea (the relative importance of the idea, and whether the organization can pull it off), and impact (how many people will be impacted by the idea).

Organizations funded by Peery Foundation

Here are some of the organizations in the Peery Foundation portfolios:

Reception

Charity evaluator GiveWell described the Peery Foundation as an "impact-focused" grantmaker (alongside the Gates Foundation, Skoll Foundation, Children's Investment Fund Foundation, Jasmine Social Investments, and Mulago Foundation). GiveWell stated in 2011 that it would consider the list of Peery Foundation grantees as part of its list of charities to review to see if they qualified for GiveWell's highest ratings.

Peery Foundation has also received mentions on a number of blogs/news websites such as the Huffington Post, the Social Capital Markets blog, and the Modern Giving blog.

Similar resources

 Acumen Fund
 Bill and Melinda Gates Foundation
 Ssamba Foundation
 Good Ventures
 Mulago Foundation
 Jasmine Social Investments
 Omidyar Network
 Skoll Foundation
 Draper Richards Kaplan Foundation

References

External links
 Website

Foundations based in the United States
Organizations based in the San Francisco Bay Area
1978 establishments in California